Chahardahi-ye Sohrab (also Romanized as Chahārdahī-ye Sohrāb) is a former village in Tashan-e Sharqi Rural District, Tashan District, Behbahan County, Khuzestan Province, Iran. The former villages of Chahardahi-ye Sohrab, Chahardahi-ye Asgar, Ablesh, Deh-e Ebrahim, Masiri & Tall Kohneh came together to create the city of Tashan. At the 2006 census, its population was 204, in 40 families.

References 

Populated places in Behbahan County